The Sandy River is a very short river in Jonesport, Maine. 
From its source, the river runs about 1 mile southeast to the coast of Chandler Bay.

See also
List of rivers of Maine

References

Maine Streamflow Data from the USGS
Maine Watershed Data From Environmental Protection Agency

Rivers of Washington County, Maine
Jonesport, Maine
Rivers of Maine